Club Deportivo Baza was a Spanish football team based in Baza, Granada, in the autonomous community of Andalusia. Founded in 1970, it last played in Primera Andaluza, and held home matches at Estadio Constantino Navarro, with a capacity of 4,500 seats.

In 2016, the club was dissolved, and two new clubs were founded in its place: CD Atlético Baza 2016 (founded in 2016, also folded in 2018) and CD Ciudad de Baza CP 2017 (founded in 2017).

Season to season

3 seasons in Segunda División B
19 seasons in Tercera División

Notable players

 Juan Pablo Vojvoda
 Kaster Bindoumou
 Prince Asubonteng
 Aldo Adorno
 Rubén Pazos
 Álvaro del Moral

External links
Official blog 
lapreferente.com profile 
futbolme.com profile

Football clubs in Andalusia
Association football clubs established in 1970
Divisiones Regionales de Fútbol clubs
1970 establishments in Spain
Association football clubs disestablished in 2016
2016 disestablishments in Spain
Province of Granada